Chauran Adda Rajputtan is a village located 9 km from Muridke, Pakistan. It was established in 1976 by a family named Agha. Currently, more than 80 families live in the hamlet.

The area is politically active, and tends to support the Pakistan Tehreek -e-insaf. Economic activity has increased in Chaura Rajputtan since the opening of a large branch of MCB bank.

Villages in Sheikhupura District